Adaguru Huchegowda Vishwanath (born 15 December 1949) is an Indian politician from Karnataka state. He is a leader of Bharatiya Janata party. He is a Nominated Member of Karnataka Legislative Council. He was the former president of Karnataka unit of the Janata Dal (Secular) .

Career
Vishwanath has been in active politics since 1970s. He was a member of Karnataka Legislative Assembly for three terms, held State and Cabinet minister posts in the Government of Karnataka as member of Congress Party. In 2009, he contested 15th Lok Sabha and succeeded C. H. Vijayashankar. During his term as M.P., Vishwanath was also member of several committees. Vishwanath quit the Congress party to join the JD(S) in 2017 and got elected from Hunsur in 2018. He resigned as MLA and speaker has disqualified him from the legislative assembly on 28 July 2019. But in by-elections of December 2019 he lost to H P Manjunath of Congress party. In July 2020 he was nominated to Legislative council.

Positions held

Controversies

Operation Kamala

He was one of the 15 MLAs who fell in Operation Kamala and resigned in July 2019, effectively bringing down the H. D. Kumaraswamy-led coalition government of Indian National Congress and Janata Dal (Secular).

Bibliography
 
 Bombay Days - releasing soon

See also
 15th Lok Sabha
 Lok Sabha
 Politics of India
 Mysore (Lok Sabha constituency)

References

External links 
 Detailed Profile: Shri Adagooru Huchegowda Vishwanath at India.gov.in

India MPs 2009–2014
Lok Sabha members from Karnataka
Indian National Congress politicians from Karnataka
Politicians from Mysore
Living people
1949 births
Karnataka MLAs 1978–1983
Karnataka MLAs 1989–1994
Karnataka MLAs 1999–2004
Bharatiya Janata Party politicians from Karnataka
Janata Dal (Secular) politicians
United Progressive Alliance candidates in the 2014 Indian general election